Douris may refer to:

 Douris, Lebanon, a village in the Bekaa Valley of Lebanon

People
 Duris of Samos (Greek: Δοῦρις ὁ Σάμιος; c. 350 BC–after 281 BC), Greek historian and tyrant of Samos
 Douris (vase painter) (Greek: Δοῦρις; fl. c. 500–460 BCE), ancient Athenian red-figure vase-painter and potter
 Peter Douris (born 1966), Canadian professional ice hockey player
 Raina Douris (born 1986), Canadian radio broadcaster

See also
 Duris (disambiguation)
 Douri, a surname